Gymnastics events have been staged at the Olympic Games since 1896. German male gymnasts have participated in every Summer Olympics except 1920, 1924, 1928, 1932.  Additionally Germany was banned from participating in the 1948 Summer Olympics.  At the 1956, 1960, and 1964 Olympic Games athletes from East and West Germany competed as the United Team of Germany.  From 1968 through 1988 East Germany and West Germany competed separately.  Athletes representing East Germany and West Germany are not included on this list.

Fabian Hambüchen has represented Germany at the Olympics the most with four appearances; Andreas Wecker also competed in four Olympics although he represented East Germany in 1988 and Germany at his three subsequent Olympic Games.  Marcel Nguyen and Andreas Toba have each represented Germany at three Olympic Games.

Gymnasts

Medalists

See also 

 List of Olympic female artistic gymnasts for Germany

References 

gymnasts
Germany